Senator Dockery may refer to:

Alfred Dockery (1797–1875), North Carolina State Senate
Paula Dockery (born 1961), Florida State Senate